Kim Dae-Keon (born April 27, 1977) is a South Korean football player who currently plays for Chunnam Dragons. (formerly Gyeongnam FC, Jeonbuk Hyundai Motors, Bucheon SK Gwangju Sangmu Bulsajo, and Suwon Samsung Bluewings).

Biography

Career

External links 
 

1977 births
Living people
South Korean footballers
K League 1 players
Gyeongnam FC players
Jeonbuk Hyundai Motors players
Jeju United FC players
Gimcheon Sangmu FC players
Suwon Samsung Bluewings players
Busan IPark players
Association football defenders